Protein Red is a protein that in humans is encoded by the IK gene.

The protein encoded by this gene was identified by its RED repeat, a stretch of repeated arginine, glutamic acid and aspartic acid residues. The protein localizes to discrete dots within the nucleus, excluding the nucleolus. Its function is unknown. This gene maps to chromosome 5; however, a pseudogene may exist on chromosome 2.

References

Further reading